The FIBT World Championships 1958 took place in Garmisch-Partenkirchen, West Germany for the fourth time. The West German city had hosted the event previously in 1934 (Four-man), 1938 (Four-man), and 1953.

Two man bobsleigh

Four man bobsleigh

Medal table

References
2-Man bobsleigh World Champions
4-Man bobsleigh World Champions

IBSF World Championships
Sport in Garmisch-Partenkirchen
1958 in bobsleigh
International sports competitions hosted by West Germany
Bobsleigh in Germany 
1958 in German sport